A toupée is a hairpiece or partial wig of natural or synthetic hair worn to cover partial baldness or for theatrical purposes. While toupées and hairpieces are typically associated with male wearers, some women also use hairpieces to lengthen existing hair, or cover a partially exposed scalp.

The toupée developed during the 18th century.

Toupées and wigs 
While most toupées are small and designed to cover bald spots at the top and back of the head, large toupées are not unknown.

Toupées are often referred to as hairpieces, units, or hair systems.  Many women now wear hairpieces rather than full wigs if their hair loss is confined to the top and crown of their heads.

Etymology

Toupée comes from the French toupet, meaning tuft of hair, as in a curl or lock of hair at the top of the head, not necessarily relating to covering baldness.

History

18th century
The toupée developed during the 18th century, large toupées were popular in the 1770s. Their popularity began to fade after the French Revolution.

19th century
In the United States, toupée use (as opposed to wigs) grew in the 19th century. One researcher has noted that this is in part due to a shift in perceptions over the perceived value of aging that occurred at that time.  Men chose to attempt to appear younger, and toupées were one method used.

...since 1800, the U.S. Census generally shows far more 39-year-olds than 40-year-olds. Furthermore, the costume of men switched from a design clearly intended to make the young look older to one that was clearly intended to make the old look younger.  For example, this era saw the decline of the wig and the rise of the toupée.

20th century
By the 1950s, it was estimated that over 350,000 U.S. men wore hairpieces, out of a potential 15 million wearers.  Toupée manufacturers helped to build credibility for their product starting in 1954, when several makers advertised hairpieces in major magazines and newspapers, with successful results.  Key to the promotion and acceptance of toupées was improved toupée craftsmanship, pioneered by Max Factor.  Factor's toupées were carefully made and almost invisible, with each strand of hair sewed to a piece of fine flesh-colored lace, and in a variety of long and short hairstyles.  Factor, also a Hollywood makeup innovator, was the supplier of choice for most Hollywood actors.

By 1959, total U.S. sales were estimated by Time magazine to be $15 million a year.  Sears-Roebuck, which had sold toupées as early as 1900 via its mail order catalog, tried to tap into the market by sending out 30,000 special catalogs by direct mail to a targeted list, advertising "career winning" hair products manufactured by Joseph Fleischer & Co., a respected wig manufacturer.  Toupées continued to be advertised in print, likely with heavier media buys taking place in magazines with the appropriate male demographic.  A typical "advertorial" can be found in Modern Mechanix .

By 1970, Time magazine estimated that in the U.S., toupées were worn by more than 2.5 million men out of 17–20 million balding men.  The increase was chalked up once again to further improvements in hairpiece technology, a desire to seem more youthful, and the long hairstyles that were increasingly in fashion.

21st century
Toupée and wig manufacture is no longer centered in the U.S., but in Asia. Aderans, based in Japan, is one of the world’s largest wigmakers, with 35% share of the Japanese domestic market.

From 2002 to 2004, new orders from Aderans's male customers (both domestic and international) slipped by 30%.  Researchers at both the Daiwa Institute and Nomura Research – two key Japanese economic research institutes – conclude that there is "no sign of a recovery" for the toupée industry.  Sales for male wearers have continued to fall at Aderans in every year since, aside from 2016 where they increased slightly.

These numbers confirm the media consensus that toupée use is in decline overall.

Manufacture

Toupées are often custom made to the needs of the wearer, and can be manufactured using either synthetic or human hair.  Toupées are usually held to one's head using an adhesive, but the cheaper versions often merely use an elastic band.

Toupée manufacture is often done at the local level by a craftsman, but large wig manufacturers also produce toupées.  Both individuals and large firms have constantly innovated to produce better quality toupées and toupée material, with over 60 patents for toupées. and over 260 for hairpieces  filed at the U.S. Patent Office since 1790.

The first patent for a toupée was filed in 1921, and the first patent for a "hairpiece" was filed in 1956.

Hair weaves

Hair weaves are a technique in which the toupée's base is then woven into whatever natural hair the wearer retains.  While this may result in a less detectable toupée, the wearer can experience discomfort, and sometimes hair loss from frequently retightening of the weave as one's own hair grows.  After about six months a person can begin to lose hair permanently along the weave area, resulting in traction alopecia.  Hair weaves were very popular in the 1980s & 1990s, but are not usually recommended because of the potential for permanent hair damage and hair loss.

Use and maintenance
While toupée dealers and manufacturers usually advertise their products showing men swimming, water-skiing and enjoying watersports, these activities can often cause irreversible wear to the toupée.  Saltwater and chlorine can cause a toupée to "wear out" quickly. Many shampoos and soaps will damage toupée fibers, which unlike natural hair, cannot grow back or replace themselves.

While dealers of toupées can in fact help many customers to care for their toupées and make their presence virtually undetectable, the hairpieces must be of very high quality to begin with, carefully fitted, and maintained regularly and carefully.  Even the best-cared-for toupée will need to be replaced on a regular basis, due to wear and, over time, to the growing areas of baldness on the wearer's head and changes in the shade of remaining hair.

Toupée wearers may choose to own two or even three toupées at a time, ensuring that they have one to wear while the other is being cleaned, and, optionally, a spare.

Alternatives
Men typically wear toupées after resorting to less extreme methods of coverage.  The first tactic is to make remaining hair appear thick and widespread through a combover.  Other alternatives include non-surgical hair replacement, which consists of a very thin hairpiece which is put on with a medical adhesive and worn for weeks at a time.

Medications and medical procedures

Propecia, Rogaine and other pharmaceutical remedies were approved for treatment of Alopecia by the U.S. Food and Drug Administration in the 1990s.  These have proven capable of regrowing or sustaining existing hair at least part of the time.

However, hair transplantation, which guarantees at least some immediate results, has often replaced the use of toupées among those who can afford them, particularly onscreen celebrities.

Baldness as fashion, acceptance of hair loss
Other trends leading to the decline in toupée use include a rise in acceptance of baldness by those men experiencing it. Short haircuts, in fashion since the 1990s, have tended to minimize the appearance of baldness, and many balding men choose to shave their heads entirely.

Humor
Toupées have a long and often humorous history in Western culture.  The toupée is a regular butt of jokes in many media, with a typical toupée joke focusing on the wearer's inability to recognize how ineffective the toupée is in concealing their baldness.  An early instance of "toupée humor" was an illustration by George Cruikshank in "The Comic Almanack" in 1837, in which he drew the effect of a strong wind, with a man's toupée whipped from his head.

In the 20th century, toupées were a source of humor in virtually all forms of media, including cartoons, films, radio and television.  In the 21st century, toupées continue to be a source for humor, with a variety of internet sites devoted to toupées, with a special emphasis on suspected celebrity hairpiece wearers. Also, toupée is a homophone of "to pay" and has been used in many jokes.

Thaddeus Stevens, famed 19th century U.S. Congressman and abolitionist, was known for his humor and wit. On one occasion while in the Capitol, a woman requested a lock of his hair (collecting locks of hair was common at this time).  Since he was bald and wearing a toupée, he ripped it off and gave it to her.

There was a long-running gag in Morecambe and Wise Show about Ernie Wise's wig; in reality he had a full head of hair.

Known wearers 
Film and television stars of both past and present often wear toupées for professional reasons, particularly as they begin to age and need to maintain the image their fans have become accustomed to. However, many of these same celebrities go "uncovered" when not working or making public appearances.

 Bud Abbott
 Marv Albert
 Steve Allen
 Neil Aspinall
 Fred Astaire 
 Raymond Bailey
 Edgar Bergen
 Humphrey Bogart
 George Burns
 Archie Campbell
 Sean Connery
 Gary Cooper
 Howard Cosell
 Bing Crosby
 Peter Cushing
 Bobby Darin
 Ted Danson
 Charles O. Finley
 Bruce Forsyth
 Paul Harvey
 Ted Healy
 Charlton Heston
 Frankie Howerd
 Gene Kelly
 Jack Klugman
 Frankie Laine
 Bela Lugosi
 Fred MacMurray
 Miles Malleson
 Groucho Marx
 John L. Mica
 Ray Milland
 Ricardo Montalbán
 James C. Morton
 Charles Nelson Reilly
 Carl Reiner
 Rob Reiner
 Burt Reynolds
 John D. Rockefeller
 William Roth
 William Shatner
 Frank Sinatra
 James Stewart
 Rip Taylor
 James Traficant
 Billy Vaughn
 John Wayne
 Hank Williams

Notes

References 

Fashion accessories
Human appearance
Wigs